The Independence Day Parade is held every 31 August in commemoration of Malaya's independence. Since independence, the event has been usually held at the Independence Square in Kuala Lumpur, the original site of the first independence parade held on 1 September 1957.

There were also times where the celebrations were held on a smaller scale. In 2009, the national day parade was held at a small scale in the Parliament of Malaysia. The audience was reduced to 4,000 because of the 2009 flu pandemic at that time. The 2010 parade was also the first time that an Independence Day Parade will be held indoors instead of outdoors, with the 2011 celebrations originally planned to be held in a larger arena due to the success of that year's edition but was later planned to be at the Independence Square in Kuala Lumpur to be held on 16 September, Malaysia Day, for the very first time.

The human graphic display is one of the many regular features of the parade, together with the mass presentation by members of Soka Gakkai Malaysia and the Selangor Department of Education, dressed in the colours of the national flag, forming different displays in the ground, as well as of an multi-racial percussion (and sometimes instrumental) component.

Summary of the parade

At the Independence Square in front of the Sultan Abdul Samad Building or since 1985 in various Malaysian state capitals and in Putrajaya since 2003, a stage is set for the guests and government and military personnel and officials in attendance. The Prime Minister of Malaysia and the Deputy Prime Minister are also there at this time. The Royal Malay Regiment or another military unit of the three services of the Malaysian Armed Forces (sometimes with the Mounted Ceremonial Squadron, Royal Armoured Corps) prepares to fulfill its duties as the Guard of Honour Company, with a military band joining them.

In some venues and in Kuala Lumpur, a human graphic display is also being readied, and members of Soka Gakkai Malaysia, by then now formed on the parade grounds or on the streets, prepares its field presentation by forming the Flag of Malaysia on the parade square. An instrumental ensemble of Malaysian ethnic percussion also readies their performances much later.

Arrival of the Sovereigns
At 8:00 in the morning, HM the Yang di-Pertuan Agong and HM the Raja Permaisuri Agong arrive at the venue, accompanied by a Royal Procession by members of the Royal Malaysian Police and the Mounted Ceremonial Squadron, RAC. The Guard of Honor Company, now at attention, renders a Royal Salute to the Sovereigns (in light of the Yang di-Pertuan Agong's responsibilities as Supreme Commander in Chief of the Armed Forces), the unit Colors of the GOH battalion (Sovereign's and Regimental) are dipped and the National Anthem, Negaraku, is played by the military band.

After this, the GOH does shoulder and then order arms. The GOH commander then salutes his sword and then reports to the Yang di-Pertuan Agong that the GOH is ready for inspection.

Royal Inspection
By the time the inspection starts the slow Menjunjung Duli march is played. The Yang di-Pertuan Agong inspects the GOH Company and salutes its Sovereign's and Regimental Colours.

When it ends, the GOH commander then reports the end of the inspection and asks for the GOH to march past, and later orders the company for the Royal Salute. The National Anthem is then played again and the Colours are again dipped in the presence of the Sovereigns. The human graphic display by then shows "Daulat Tuanku" (Long Live the King) written on it. After this, the GOH Company executes shoulder arms and turn right and then perform a march past.

Flag Raising and the Rukunegara recitation
At the parade venue, a colour guard by servicemen from the Royal Malaysian Navy escorting the Flag of Malaysia approach the Flagpole together with selected Malaysians, reenacting the flag raising which had been done in Stadium Merdeka in 1957. The flag is raised to Negaraku and a 21-gun salute is done by gunners of the Royal Artillery Regiment (usually the unit firing the guns is the 43rd Battalion, Royal Artillery Regiment). After the flag raising, the Rukunegara (National Principles) is first read by the emcee and in recent years, the Maka kami part of the pledge onward is then recited with the left hand at the shoulder level. After this, seven shouts of Merdeka! (Independence!) with the left hand raised are said, and since 2007 and from 2009 onward, even the theme for that year is being shouted as well.

Cultural and patriotic performances
After the flag raising, patriotic songs are sung with the accompaniment of ethnic percussion. Young dancers dressed as the various races and ethnic groups of the country dance about, with that year's theme song as one of the numbers. The SGM  members and education students perform delicate and well prepared formations on the parade grounds, while the human graphic display shows intricate writings on the stand made by pompoms and coloured flags among others.

Parade segment

Flypast
Planes of the Royal Malaysian Air Force, the Malaysian Army Air Force and the Royal Malaysian Navy fly overhead in a salute to the nation, led by military helicopters flying the Flag of Malaysia, the Flags of the Malaysian Armed Forces and its three services and the flags of the 13 Malaysian states and 3 Malaysian federal territories. Military aircraft (planes, jets and helicopters) then follow behind the colours party followed by aircraft from the Royal Malaysian Police.

Civil-military march past
After the flypast, the much-awaited civil/military march starts with the march past of the Malaysian national and state flags. Military and police contingents from the Malaysian Armed Forces and the Royal Malaysian Police, youth uniformed groups, Army, Air Force and Navy special operations commandos, Armed Forces and Police counter-terrorist units, bomb squads, pilots of the Royal Malaysian Air Force and the Royal Malaysian Navy's Naval Air Group, military reservists, personnel of the RELA Corps, Maritime Enforcement Agency, Civil Defence Force, Fire and Rescue Department and the Prisons Department, civilian organisations veterans organizations  and local government delegations (including the Kuala Lumpur City Hall), federal ministries and business entities march past the parade stage in front of the Sovereigns and guests on the stage. The march past also includes a number of historical companies. Military bands and marching bands also march past, playing music to the delight of everyone in attendance, and when they pass by the Sovereigns their drum majors, conductors and colour guards salute them. One of the top contingents marching past is the contingent representing Malaysian animation (formed by  the Animation Society and animation production firm  Les' Copaque Production), in recent years this part of the march past has also seen interactive public participation as well.

Floats
In every parade, floats representing the various companies and corporations celebrating the occasion drive past the street to the amazement of everyone, due to their intricate designs and various features, as well as the people which are on the floats themselves.

Mobile and mounted columns
Also part of the parade is the mobile column showing the different vehicles of the Malaysian Armed Forces, the Royal Malaysian Police, the Civil Defence Forces, Fire and Rescue Agency, Prisons Agency and Kuala Lumpur City Hall plus representatives of the federal ministries and the private sector. The mobile column also includes veterans from the uniformed and civil services of the federation and the states and territories. Rounding up the parade is the mounted column composed of members of the MCS and mounted squadrons from the RMP and the KLCH.

A civil mobile column is also featured, made up of nationally produced vehicles from firms like Proton and others, and vintage cars from a number of manufacturers honoring the transport manufacture workers of the country.

Venues held

Independence Square, Kuala Lumpur

See also
 Hari Merdeka

Parades in Malaysia
August events
Recurring events established in 1957
1957 establishments in Malaya
Military parades